Ushna Suhail (born 26 June 1993 in Lahore) is a female tennis player from Pakistan.

Suhail on 12 December 2016, she reached her best singles ranking of world number 943. On 11 July 2016, she peaked at world number 864 in the doubles rankings.

Playing for Pakistan at the Fed Cup, Suhail has a win–loss of 24–42.

Suhail is a cousin of Aisam-ul-Haq Qureshi.

Career
Suhail represents Pakistan and competes on the ITF Pro Circuit tour. South Asian Games Double Bronze Medalist in singles and mixed doubles, Pakistan's first  world-ranked female tennis player in singles and doubles.

2014
In September 2014, Suhail along with Sara Mansoor became the first women tennis players from Pakistan to participate at the Asian Games when they competed at the Asian Games being held in Incheon, South Korea. 2015 she made to the semi finals of three tournaments at Sharm el-Sheikh futures.

Fed Cup participation

Singles: (12-22)

Doubles: (10-16)

References

External links

 
 
 
 
 Ushna Suhail on Facebook
 Ushna Suhail on Instagram
 Ushna Suhail on YouTube
 Ushna Suhail Official Website

1993 births
Living people
People from Lahore
Pakistani female tennis players
Tennis players at the 2014 Asian Games
Tennis players at the 2018 Asian Games
Asian Games competitors for Pakistan
South Asian Games bronze medalists for Pakistan
South Asian Games medalists in tennis
21st-century Pakistani women